Wohlfahrtiimonas chitiniclastica is a bacterium from the genus of Wohlfahrtiimonas which has been first isolated from the larva of Wohlfahrtia magnifica from Budapest in Hungary. Wohlfahrtiimonas chitiniclastica can cause sepsis in rare cases.

References

Further reading 
 

Gammaproteobacteria
Bacteria described in 2008